George Truog House is a historic home in Cumberland, Allegany County, Maryland, United States. It is a 3-story brick structure built in 1903. The house was designed by local architect Wright Butler, and built by George Truog, proprietor of the Maryland Glass Etching Works in Cumberland from 1893 to 1911.  It contains a unique collection of decorative glass.

The George Truog House was listed on the National Register of Historic Places in 1986.

References

External links
, including photo in 1974, at Maryland Historical Trust

Houses on the National Register of Historic Places in Maryland
Houses in Allegany County, Maryland
Buildings and structures in Cumberland, Maryland
Houses completed in 1903
National Register of Historic Places in Allegany County, Maryland